Hackettstown is a New Jersey Transit station in Hackettstown, New Jersey. The station is located at the intersection of Valentine Street and Beatty Street and is the western terminus of the Morristown Line and the Montclair-Boonton Line, which both provide service to Hoboken Terminal or to Pennsylvania Station in Midtown Manhattan via Midtown Direct. Hackettstown station is the only active New Jersey Transit station in Warren County. The line from Hackettstown – Dover is diesel powered, requiring a transfer at Dover, Montclair State University or Newark Broad Street to an electrified train to New York Penn Station. Proposals exist of an extension of the Montclair-Boonton Line, including an extension to Washington and possibly Phillipsburg further along the Washington Secondary.

History 
Service west of Netcong station began on October 31, 1994, with an extension of the Boonton Line westward along Norfolk Southern's Washington Secondary. The station was opened along with Mount Olive station near Waterloo Village and the International Trade Center in the namesake township. Originally, the Delaware, Lackawanna and Western Railroad (DL&W) served Hackettstown with a large station in downtown Hackettstown for its Old Main alignment. The large wooden station was a Type W-2 station (from DL&W railroad documents) built in 1868. Hackettstown station was razed in the late 1960s after passenger service on most Erie-Lackawanna Railroad branches terminated in October 1966.

Station layout
Hackettstown has one low-level side platform.

See also 
Warren Railroad

References 

1994 establishments in New Jersey
Hackettstown, New Jersey
NJ Transit Rail Operations stations
Railway stations in the United States opened in 1994
Railway stations in Warren County, New Jersey
Former Delaware, Lackawanna and Western Railroad stations
Railway stations in the United States opened in 1854
1854 establishments in New Jersey
Railway stations closed in 1966